IK Comet Halden is an ice hockey club based in Halden, Norway. They currently play in the First Division. They play their home games in Halden Ishall. Their team colours are green, black and white.

History
Ishockeyklubben Comet was founded in 1961. Without a rink of their own, and struggling in the shadow of local greats Sparta Warriors and Stjernen the club found it hard to get a breakthrough. In 1988 they got their own arena, Halden Ishall, and settled in the second highest league for most of the nineties.

In 1997 however an economical crisis forced the club to withdraw, and start again in the third division. Helped on by Swedish businessman Siwert Hjalmarsson the club again found its feet, and started to climb in the standings. In the spring of 2004 Comet had their greatest day so far, when, after beating Hasle/Løren in the final qualifying game, secured promotion to the top league.

The problems surrounding their arena however put dark clouds on the horizon. With its 1200 capacity and limited facilities Halden Ishall is not of GET-ligaen standards.

In 2008 I.K. Comet reached the semi-finals for the first time after upsetting derby rivals Sparta in seven games of the quarter-finals. (4-2 in games)

In October 2009, the club went bankrupt after a long period of financial troubles. The club restarted on the second tier in 2010.

Season-by-season results
This is a partial list of the last five seasons completed by Comet. For the full season-by-season history, see List of IK Comet seasons.

Former players

 Timo Hakanen

 Tor Sønju Bårnes
 Jo Magnus Hegg
 Jesper Hoel
 Inge Stokvik
 Henrik Bjørneby
 Øyvind Andreassen 

 Peter Andersson
 Magnus Eriksson
 Mattias Gudmundsson
 Mattias Guter

References

External links
 

Ice hockey teams in Norway